The following is a list of 2008 Minnesota tornadoes.  Minnesota is a state located in the North Central United States along the northern edge of Tornado Alley, and on average receives 24 tornadoes per year.  2008 was a more active year historically, with 43 confirmed tornado touchdowns.  Thirty-eight of the tornadoes (or 88%) were considered minor, rated EF0 or EF1 on the Enhanced Fujita scale.  The remaining five tornadoes were rated as significant, at EF2 or EF3.

The 43 tornadoes combined to cause $42.7 million in damage: $40.06 million in property damage and $2.66 million in crop damage.  The tornadoes combined to injure 24 people, with one fatality reported from an EF3 tornado in Hugo on May 25.  The date range of the tornadoes was smaller than normal, lasting exactly two months, from just May 25–July 24.

Confirmed tornadoes

May

May 25

May 30

June

June 6

June 7

June 9

June 11

June 12

June 14

July

July 6

July 10

July 11

July 14

July 16

July 17

July 19

July 24

See also
 2009 Minnesota tornadoes
 Climate of Minnesota
 List of North American tornadoes and tornado outbreaks

References

External links
 NWS - 2008 Minnesota tornado listing
 Minnesota Tornado History and Statistics

Climate of Minnesota
Tornadoes in Minnesota
Tornadoes of 2008
2008 in Minnesota
May 2008 events in the United States